Bothamsall is a village and civil parish in the Bassetlaw district of Nottinghamshire, England.

According to the United Kingdom Census 2001 it had a population of 185, increasing (with the inclusion of Bevercotes and Haughton) to 270 at the 2011 Census.

History and amenities 

The village is situated about seven miles south of East Retford. The parish church of St Peter and St Mary was built in 1845, replacing an earlier church from which the font was retained. Next to the River Meden at the west end of the village is a small motte-and-bailey castle.

The Robin Hood Way waymarked long-distance footpath passes through the village.

Lound Hall 
Lound Hall is a substantial 70-room country house which sits on the outskirts of Bothamsall village. The current house was built in the 1930s for Sir Harald Peake, although there has been a manor house on the site since the 1700s. 
The ruins of Haughton Chapel can be found within the grounds of the estate.

The Lound Hall Estate is responsible for the upkeep of a number of local churches, which have been under the care of the Lord of the Manor since the 1800s. 
The Hall was requisitioned during World War II for use as a base for the Royal Air Force, and then later became a military hospital for injured servicemen.

The hall was sold in 2009 to couple, Robert Everist and Susan Mills. 2010 saw the start of a significant and vital restoration. The project was financed by the Hall's owners, who use the mansion as their primary home.

The house and gardens are not currently open to the public but the exterior and stable courtyard can be seen from footpaths that pass through the grounds and main drive.

Bothamsall Hall 

Bothamsall Hall is a fine stone country house built by the Duke of Newcastle which sits on the hill in the centre of Bothamsall village. The original house dated back to c.1673 and was demolished and re built in c.1845 along with the church by the Duke of Newcastle, the stone and mullion windows were recycled from the demolished 15th century Worksop Manor with a later wing added In 1906. The hall enjoys a prominent position overlooking the village and surrounding parkland. The hall has been refurbished over the past five years (2012 onwards) most recently the coach house and stables which have been converted into annex accommodation by the current owners.

See also
Listed buildings in Bothamsall

References

External links 

The village on Genuki
www.geograph.co.uk photos of Bothamsall and surrounding area
www.geograph.co.uk photos of Lound Hall and surrounding estate

Villages in Nottinghamshire
Civil parishes in Nottinghamshire
Bassetlaw District